Sarojaninagar, also spelled Sarojini Nagar, is a community development block in Lucknow district, Uttar Pradesh, India. It is part of the tehsil of Lucknow and it includes 90 villages. As of 2011, its population was 224,045, in 40,923 households.

Sarojaninagar is also the name of two wards of Lucknow, together making up 32 mohallas of the city.

Demographics 
As of 2011, the sex ratio of Sarojaninagar block is 903 females for every 1000 males, with 53% of block residents (117,745) being male and 47% (106,300) being female. The sex ratio in the 0-6 age group was 920. Members of scheduled castes made up 37.2% of the Sarojaninagar block population, and members of scheduled tribes made up 0.11%. The literacy rate of Sarojaninagar block in 2011 was 73.0% (81.1% among males and 64.1% among females).

In 2011, Sarojaninagar block's workforce consisted of 74,661 people (33.3% of the overall block population). More men (59,508, or 50.5%) were workers than women (15,153, or 14.3%). A plurality of workers were employed in agriculture — 23.53% were cultivators who owned or leased their own land, and another 26.26% were agricultural labourers who worked someone else's land for wages. A further 6.25% were household industry workers, and the remaining 43.96% were other workers.

Demographic history 
The 1961 census recorded Sarojininagar block as having a total population of 107,880 people (57,375 male and 50,505 female), in 22,327 households and 22,022 physical houses.

The 1981 census recorded Sarojininagar as the most heavily industrialised of Lucknow district's development blocks, with 56 registered industrial firms. At the time, it comprised 106 villages, including 94 gram sabhas and 13 nyaya panchayats.

Land use 
Sarojaninagar block covers an area of 30,526.9 hectares, of which 58.2% (17,770.8 hectares, not counting fallow land) is farmland as of 2011. Most of this farmland is irrigated: 16,054.8 hectares, or 90.3% as of the same year. Irrigation is mostly by tanks or lakes. Areas under non-agricultural use made up 3,537.4 hectares as of 2011, or about 11.6% of the total land area. Land considered barren and unsuitable for cultivation covered 1219 hectares. As of 2011, 1,027 hectares in this block are covered by forests.

Villages 
Sarojaninagar block comprises the following 90 villages:

References 

Lucknow district
Lucknow division